Urioste is a surname. Notable people with the surname include:

 (born 1980), Bolivian writer
Frank J. Urioste (born 1938), American film editor
George and Joanne Urioste (born  1952) and George Urioste (born  1937), American rock climbers